Nguyễn Thị Hồng (born 17 March 1979) is a Vietnamese female paralympic powerlifter. She competed in Athens 2004 and London 2012 paralympics.

References

External links
IPC Profile
London 2012 Profile

1979 births
Living people
Paralympic powerlifters of Vietnam
Powerlifters at the 2004 Summer Paralympics
Powerlifters at the 2012 Summer Paralympics